The Panama Canal fence was a separation barrier built by the United States in the Panama Canal Zone that divided the Republic of Panama into two separate sections. The Canal Zone, primarily consisting of the Panama Canal, was a strip of land running from the Pacific Ocean to the Caribbean. The fence, also called “Fence of Shame” and "another Berlin Wall” portrayed the centre of geopolitical and diplomatic turmoil between the United States and the Republic of Panama.  Some evidences suggest construction, breaking and repairs of the fence while others including many aerial photographs and Life magazine (January 24, 1964) confirm that there was no such physical barrier between the Canal Zone and Panama.

Background 
Panama gained independence from Colombia with the assistance of the United States and was recognized as a separate state in 1903. Diplomatic relations were established on November 13, 1903 between the United States and Panama. Both countries signed the Hay-Bunau-Varilla treaty. The treaty provided the United States with sovereignty over the Canal Zone. In exchange, the Republic of Panama received a $10 million payment and additional annual payments which began with the opening of the canal. In addition to this purchase from Panama, the United States bought the title to all lands in the Canal Zone, including a payment of $40 million to the French Canal Company for their properties.

Amid much resentment among Panamanians, the treaty granted the Canal Zone, a strip 5 miles (8.0 km) wide on each side of the Panama Canal, in perpetuity to the United States to build, manage, strengthen and defend an inter-oceanic canal. The Canal Zone which became a U.S. territory and had its own police, post offices, courts, television and radio stations.

The Panama Canal fence, dubbed as “Fence of Shame” and "The other Berlin Wall”. was the demarcation line between the Canal Zone and Republic of Panama.

Construction 
Due to lack of evidence in the knowledge base, the dimensions of the fence or the construction details are not available. According to McPherson (2002) the "construction started at the end of the 1950s when Panamanian students threatened with a "patriotic invasion" "

Beginning of the end 
A scuffle between Zonian and Panamanian high school students over hosting Panamanian and US flags in the Canal Zone erupted into a protest on January 9, 1964. This was a result of an ongoing flag hosting dispute between US and Panama, over the period between 1959 and 1964. It led to series of incidents of civil unrest. The flag desecration incident, despite conflicting claims, sparked antiracial sentiments and angry crowds formed along the fenced border between Panama City and the Canal Zone. According to Jackson (1999) at several points demonstrators stormed into the zone, planting Panamanian flags and began to tear down the fence creating gaps in front of the US District Court and several other spots along the fence. Canal Zone police responded firing shots and tear-gassing protesters pulling or climbing on the fence.

The riots left four Americans and twenty-two Panamanians dead. The day, January 9, is marked in Panama as Martyrs’ Day and is a national holiday. These events compelled President Roberto Chiari to take the historic decision to break diplomatic relations with the United States. Although the diplomatic relations between Panama and the United States were re-established on April 3, 1964, through the joint declaration Moreno-Bunker, events led to the resentment of Panamanians.  U.S. President Jimmy Carter, stipulated joint administration of the Canal starting in 1979. Pushed by internal political turmoil, supported by external international organizations such as the United Nations and the Movement of Non-Aligned Countries over the years and after a number of treaties the Republic of Panama was assumed the total jurisdiction and operational control over the Canal on  December 31, 1999.

Controversy 

The existence of a fence remains a controversy.

Photographic evidence such as the cover of Life magazine on January 24, 1964 and the www.criticalpast.com video "Border between Republic of Panama and Panama Canal Zone"  and many other aerial photographs are proofs that there was no physical barrier between the Canal Zone and Panama, and one could simply walk, drive, or otherwise move between the two at will with no impediments, checkpoints, gates or similar encumbrances. Several search engines produces no photograph of a border gate between Panama and the Canal Zone, nor a fence along the 45-mile border, despite some articles claiming the existence of such structures including that of, according to Jackson (1999), on January 17, a Panama Canal Company work crew rebuilt the fence after at several points, demonstrators planted Panamanian flags on and began to tear down what they called the "fence of shame", creating gaps downhill from the United States district court, Gorgas Hospital, and many residences and government offices, as well as in several other spots along the fence near the post office and the elementary school.

References

External links 
The beginning of the end of the Panama Canal Zone
Troubled passageway: following conflict through the Panama Canal

History of Panama
History of the Panama Canal Zone

Walls
Borders of Panama
Borders of the United States
Separation barriers
Panama–United States relations